The First Battle of Nola was fought in 216 BC between the forces of Hannibal and a Roman force led by Marcus Claudius Marcellus. Hannibal was attempting to seize the town of Nola: He failed to do so, and would make two more unsuccessful attempts on the city over the next two years.

Hannibal moved to capture the city of Nola due to some leaders in the city offering to open their gates to him. A Roman force under the command of Marcellus arrived before Hannibal and was able to enter the city. Hannibal camped near the city, and daily skirmishes would happen between the two armies. Marcellus learned that the only support he enjoyed was the senators in the city. Marcellus took action to prevent betrayal by undermining the pro-Hannibal faction in the city.   Marcellus learned that some leaders in the city had been conspiring with Hannibal.  Marcellus learned that should he make any sortie from the town or draw up for battle outside, they planned on plundering the baggage and closing the gates upon him. After this, Marcellus decided his situation was not sustainable. 

He took action to protect himself from a revolt, pulled his troops from the walls, and secretly organized them behind the gates.  Hannibal drew up his men in battle order in anticipation of an attack or at least another skirmish. When nothing happened, Hannibal concluded that Marcellus had discovered his plan and would not dare attempt sortie with the threat of betrayal. Confident of this, he marched his soldiers forward to attempt an assault on the central gate. The Carthaginian forces approached with ladders and machines useful for an assault. When they did this, Marcellus sprung his trap and ordered his forces to charge out of the gates and personally lead the center.  Hannibal troops found themselves caught off guard. Hannibal made attempts to change the tide of the ensuing battle; however, when the second line of the Roman troops charged from the gates, it became clear he couldn't win the battle. After sustaining heavy losses, Hannibal ordered an organized retreat from the field to save his army from further losses. Hannibal gave up hope of capturing Nola and withdrew to a camp near Acerræ. The victory, while not decisive enough to end Hannibal's fighting potential, was a boost to Roman morale.

The battle was a minor Roman victory.

See also

References

Nola 216 BC
Nola 216 BC
Nola
Nola (216 BC)